Sainte-Luce-sur-Loire (literally Sainte-Luce on Loire) is a commune in the Loire-Atlantique department in western France. This commune is one of 24 communes that make up the intercommunality of Nantes Metropolis.

Population

See also
Communes of the Loire-Atlantique department

References

Saintelucesurloire